Ingo Schmitt is a German politician who was Member of the European Parliament for Berlin from 1999 to 2005. On 18 September 2005 he was elected to the Bundestag and consequently resigned from the European Parliament. He is a member of the conservative Christian Democratic Union.

External links
 Website from Ingo Schmitt
 Biography by German Bundestag
 Biography by CDU/CSU

Year of birth missing (living people)
Living people
Members of the Bundestag for Berlin
MEPs for Germany 1999–2004
Christian Democratic Union of Germany MEPs
MEPs for Germany 2004–2009
Pupils of Karlheinz Stockhausen
Members of the Bundestag 2005–2009
Members of the Bundestag for the Christian Democratic Union of Germany